Cà Berlone, also named Cà Berloni, is a small village (curazia) of San Marino. It belongs to the municipality of San Marino.

Geography
It is located under a hill, Monte Cucco (388 m.), near the borders with the municipality of Chiesanuova on a road from the City of San Marino. Not too far from the village, on the borders with Italy, there is an industrial area.

See also
San Marino (city)
Canepa
Casole
Castellaro
Montalbo
Murata
Santa Mustiola

Curazie in San Marino
Geography of the City of San Marino